Vasau or Vasău may refer to:

Daniel Vasau (born 1982), Tongan rugby league player
Vasău River, Romanian river